Wheeler Creek is a stream in the U.S. state of Indiana. It is a tributary of Eel River.

The namesake of Wheeler Creek is unknown.

See also
List of rivers of Indiana

References

Rivers of Kosciusko County, Indiana
Rivers of Wabash County, Indiana
Rivers of Whitley County, Indiana
Rivers of Indiana